Kaliesha West (born February 11, 1988) is a professional female boxer and the former 3 time WBO Female Bantamweight and IFBA super Bantamweight Boxing World Champion. She was born on February 11, 1988, in South Haven, Michigan. West currently resides in Moreno Valley California, a small suburb between Riverside and Palm Springs. West is a motivational speaker and an advocate for women's right's and women's boxing. 

On September 18, 2010, West won the WBO title, becoming the first world boxing champion from the Inland Empire. Her father, Juan West, is her boxing trainer and manager. She was also a contestant on the CW reality show Capture, placing 4th out of 12 teams. Currently, West is delivering her voice through social media networks, campaign, and protests across the United States in hopes to generate a following from those who believe in equal opportunities for women in sports. Some have compared her career to that of Billie Jean King.

Multi-cultural heritage
West is an athlete of multi-cultural heritage.  Her father, Juan West, is African American and European.  Her mother, Melissa, is of Mexican and Korean heritage.

Early years
West was first introduced to boxing while attending her father's boxing fights. However, her father was reluctant to involve her in the sport. Juan West tried to appease his 10-year-old daughter by showing her the proper boxing stance and how to punch. He gave her difficult training exercises to discourage her.  When she persisted, Juan took her to a gym to fight a much bigger opponent, and she lost.  West refused to give up boxing and continued her training.

High school
She attended Canyon Springs High School in Moreno Valley, where she started freshmen year as Varsity Cross Country and track. She participated in boxing activities outside of school.

Amateur career
West began her amateur career in 1998 at the age of 10. West fought for 8 years and won numerous tournaments and honors, including

2001, 2002, 2003, 2004, Junior Olympic championships, 2003, 2004, 2005 Silver Gloves championships, 2002 125 lb. National Golden Gloves championships.
2004 USA Championships
2005 Blue & Gold Championships
2005 PAL Championships
2006 West furthered her boxing career by turning professional just two weeks after her 18th birthday. West turned professional after being advised that women will not be allowed to compete in the 2008 Olympics. Her overall amateur record was 98–10.

West turns professional
Just after turning eighteen years old, West made her pro debut on February 23, 2006, at San Manuel Indian Casino in San Bernardino, California, after knocking her to the floor in round one, West won a four-round unanimous decision over former World Title holder Suzannah Warner.

West wins the WBO World Title
On September 18, 2010, at the Staples Center in Los Angeles, California, West won the vacant WBO Bantamweight title with a seventh-round TKO over Angel Gladney of South Carolina at 0:59 in a scheduled ten-rounder. She made boxing history, as she became the first boxing champion from the Inland Empire.  West also became the first female to win a world title on a Golden Boy Promotions fight card.
West successfully defended her WBO title for three consecutive years traveling the world against Mexico, Argentina, and USA.

West wins the IFBA World Title
On October 6, 2012, at the Finish Line Sports Bar and Grill in Pomona, California, West won the vacant IFBA Junior Featherweight title with a 10-round unanimous decision over Christina Ruiz of Texas. West successfully moved up to the next weight division to become a two division world champion.  West also became the first female to headline for Sugar Shane Mosley Promotions.

Public viewing
In 2013, West participated as a contestant with her boyfriend Matt on the first season of Capture, an American reality competition television series on The CW.
West was also featured as an athlete promoting Sony's new waterproof mp3 Walkman.

Championships and accomplishments
2012 IFBA International Female Boxers Association Super Bantamweight World Title
2011 Moreno Valley Grand Marshall
2010 Proclamation from the city of Moreno Valley.
2010 WBO Female Bantamweight World Title (3 defenses)
2010 First ever world champion between men and women from Inland Empire, CA.
2005 National Golden Gloves Champion
2004 First Female B.C.R. Champion
2004 Silver Gloves Champion
2003 Silver Gloves Champion
2003 Junior Olympic Champion
2002 Junior Olympic Champion

Professional boxing record

References

External links
Kaliesha West Awakening Profile

People from Moreno Valley, California
People from South Haven, Michigan
1982 births
Living people
American women boxers
American boxers of Mexican descent
Sportspeople from Michigan
Sportspeople from California
World boxing champions
Super-bantamweight boxers
Participants in American reality television series
21st-century American women